Surf's Up is a video game based on the Sony Pictures Animation film of the same name. Surf's Up the video game follows the basic story of Cody Maverick in the movie.  This game was developed by Ubisoft and is available for PC and for various console platforms.

A signature feature has Shia LaBeouf, Jeff Bridges, Zooey Deschanel, Mario Cantone, Diedrich Bader, and Sal Masekela reprising their roles from the movie.

Gameplay
As the name indicates, Surf's Up is a surfing style game (using mechanics often seen in most skateboarding video games) set at the annual "Reggie Belafonte Big Z Memorial Surf Off" as seen in the film.  Players choose from one of 10 characters from the film "Surf's Up" to play as (including Elliot from Open Season), and will experience various spots on Pen Gu Island, from North Beach, to the Boneyards, as well as Cody's home of Shiverpool as they progress in the contest.

The players are given a set of objectives to meet in each match, including finding and collecting a set number of trophies scattered throughout the level, gaining enough points from performing tricks while surfing, and maneuvering through large gates.  Each course has a large wave on either the left or right side of the screen that follows the player throughout, allowing the surfer to ride up and perform a trick as well as to garner speed for certain obstacles and ramps.

Reception

The game was met with average to poor reception.  GameRankings and Metacritic gave it a score of 66.82% and 64 out of 100 for the Wii version; 62.42% and 61 out of 100 for the Xbox 360 version; 62% and 62 out of 100 for the GameCube version; 60.75% and 62 out of 100 for the PC version; 58.37% and 59 out of 100 for the PlayStation 3 version; 58.25% and 60 out of 100 for the PlayStation 2 version; 55% and 56 out of 100 for the DS version; 55% and 55 out of 100 for the PSP version; and 45% and 45 out of 100 for the Game Boy Advance version.

References

External links
 Nintendo site
 
 
 

2007 video games
Crossover video games
Game Boy Advance games
GameCube games
Nintendo DS games
PlayStation 2 games
PlayStation 3 games
PlayStation Portable games
Sony Pictures video games
Surfing video games
Ubisoft games
Unreal Engine games
Video games developed in Canada
Video games about birds
Video games based on films
Video games scored by Jake Kaufman
Video games scored by Jamie Christopherson
Water sports video games
Wii games
Windows games
Xbox 360 games